William Ernest Reed may refer to:

 William Reed (RAF officer) (1896–?), British World War I flying ace
 Bill Reed (born 1954), ice hockey defenceman